Earthquake weather is a type of weather popularly believed to precede earthquakes.

Earthquake Weather may also refer to:

 Earthquake Weather (album), a 1989 album by Joe Strummer
 "Earthquake Weather", a song by Beck from Guero
 Earthquake Weather (novel), a 1997 novel by Tim Powers
 Earthquake Weather, a novel by Catherine Ryan Hyde